Khim Borey (born 29 September 1989) is a former Cambodian footballer who lasted for Nagaworld and the Cambodia national team. He is currently head coach of Nagaworld in the Cambodian Premier League.

International goals

Honours

Club
National Defense Ministry
Hun Sen Cup: 2010
Phnom Penh Crown
2011 AFC President's Cup: Runner up
Cambodian League: 2014

Individual
Cambodian League Golden Boot: 2008

References

External links
 

1989 births
Living people
Cambodian footballers
Cambodia international footballers
Cambodian expatriate footballers
Expatriate footballers in Thailand
Khim Borey
People from Takéo province
Association football forwards
Association football midfielders
Nagaworld FC players